The High Commissioner of Australia to Kenya is an officer of the Australian Department of Foreign Affairs and Trade and the head of the High Commission of the Commonwealth of Australia to the Republic of Kenya in Nairobi. The position has the rank and status of an Ambassador Extraordinary and Plenipotentiary and also holds non-resident accreditation to Burundi (since 2007), Rwanda (since 2007), Somalia (since 2010), Tanzania (since 1987), and Uganda (since 1965). The High Commissioner is also Permanent Representative of Australia to the United Nations Office at Nairobi, including the United Nations Environment Programme and the United Nations Human Settlements Programme, as well as representative to the East African Community and the International Conference on the Great Lakes Region. The High Commissioner is currently Luke Williams since 23 November 2020. The work of the high commissioner is supported by the Australian Consulate in Kampala, Uganda, led by honorary consul Patrick Bitature since 2010.

Posting history
With the independence of Uganda on 9 October 1962, Kenya on 12 December 1963, and Zanzibar on 10 December 1963, the responsibility for relations was held by the newly established Australian High Commission in Dar es Salaam, Tanganyika (which merged with Zanzibar to form Tanzania on 22 April 1964), which commenced operations from 17 August 1962. When the High Commission to Tanganyika and the appointment of Anthony Dingle as acting high commissioner was announced on 11 May 1962, the Minister for External Affairs, Sir Garfield Barwick, noted that the opening of the high commission was "an indication of the significance which the Australian Government attached to developing close and cordial relations with the new African countries, especially those within the Commonwealth. In addition to contact with Tanganyika itself, the new Australian mission would offer a means of contact with other important East African territories such as Kenya, Uganda and Zanzibar which were now in a state of rapid political evolution." Australia was represented at the independence celebrations for Uganda (8-10 October 1962) by former cabinet minister Sir Josiah Francis. 

On 23 August 1965, the Australian Government announced that a formal agreement on establishing full diplomatic relations had been reached with the Governments of Kenya and Uganda, with Australian High Commission to be established in Nairobi. The first Australian representative was Walter Crocker who was appointed as the resident high commissioner to Kenya, and the non-resident high commissioner to Uganda, and ambassador to Ethiopia.

From 18 May 1972 until 24 February 1983 the High Commissioners to Tanganyika/Tanzania was accredited to Zambia. When a resident high commissioner was appointed to Zambia in January 1983, responsibility for relations with Malawi, which had been held by the High Commissioner to Tanzania since its independence in 1964, was transferred to the new high commission in Lusaka.

On 25 September 1971, Australia established diplomatic relations with Mauritius, with the high commissioner in Dar es Salaam receiving non-resident accreditation until 1984. From 1976 to 1984 the high commissioner in Kenya was accredited to the Seychelles when it was transferred to the resident High Commission in Mauritius, which was established in March 1984. With the closure of the High Commission in Dar es Salaam on 23 November 1987, accreditation for Tanzania was transferred to the Kenya post. On 29 April 1976, it was announced that Australia and Madagascar had agreed to establish diplomatic relations, with the Australian High Commissioner to Tanzania receiving non-resident accreditation as ambassador until it was transferred to the resident high commissioner in Mauritius in 1984. The first ambassador, Frederick Truelove, presented his credentials on 3 May 1976. In 1983, non-resident accreditation was briefly held for Comoros, when it was also transferred to the Mauritius post in 1984.

Although the High Commission in Kenya was originally accredited to Ethiopia on its establishment in 1965, a resident embassy in Addis Ababa was established in December 1984. The embassy was closed in 1987, with accreditation returning to Nairobi until the re-establishment of the Ethiopian embassy in 2010. On 4 May 1993, Australia formally recognised the independence of Eritrea, with non-resident accreditation held by the Nairobi high commission until it was transferred to the Embassy in Cairo in 2006.

In December 2010, the Australian Consulate in Kampala, Uganda, was established, with local businessman Patrick Bitature appointed as honorary consul, and was officially opened by Geoff Tooth as high commissioner to Uganda on 17 August 2011. From 7 March 2012 to 2017, there was an Australian Consulate in Dar es Salaam, headed by local businessman Thierry Murcia as honorary consul.

Following a 2004-05 review of security at Australia's overseas missions, where the Nairobi mission was classified as "high risk", in March 2014 the Joint Parliamentary Standing Committee for Public Works approved construction of a new High Commission chancery on an  greenfield site in the suburb of Rosslyn, Nairobi, designed by Brisbane-based James Cubitt Architects. This replaced the previous High Commission site since 1989 in the Groganville Estate, which no longer met security or amenity requirements.

High Commissioners

Resident High Commissioners to Tanganyika/Tanzania

Notes
 Also non-resident High Commissioner to Uganda, 23 August 1965–present.
 Also non-resident Ambassador to Ethiopia, 23 August 1965–December 1984 and 1987–2010.
 Also non-resident High Commissioner to the Seychelles, 1976–March 1984.
 Also non-resident High Commissioner to Tanzania, 23 November 1987–present.
 Also non-resident Ambassador to Burundi, 2007–present.
 Also non-resident Ambassador (2007–2009) and High Commissioner (2009–present) to Rwanda.
 Also non-resident Ambassador to Somalia, 2010–present.
 Also non-resident High Commissioner to Mauritius, 25 September 1971–March 1984.
 Also non-resident High Commissioner to Zambia, 18 May 1972–24 February 1983.
 Also non-resident Ambassador to Madagascar, 3 May 1976–1984.
 Also non-resident Ambassador to Comoros, 1983–1984.
 Also non-resident Ambassador to Eritrea, 4 May 1993–2006.

See also
Australia–Kenya relations

References

External links

Australian High Commission, Kenya

 
 
 
 
 
Kenya
Australia
Australia
Australia and the Commonwealth of Nations
Kenya and the Commonwealth of Nations
Tanzania and the Commonwealth of Nations
Uganda and the Commonwealth of Nations